Nebraska Cornhuskers gymnastics refers to one of the following:
Nebraska Cornhuskers men's gymnastics
Nebraska Cornhuskers women's gymnastics